Gask (also Romanized as Gāsg and Gesg) is a village in Fakhrud Rural District of Miyandasht District, Darmian County, South Khorasan province, Iran. At the 2006 National Census, its population was 565 in 174 households, when it was in Qohestan District. The following census in 2011 counted 613 people in 192 households. The latest census in 2016 showed a population of 581 people in 190 households; it was the largest village in its rural district. After the census, Miyandasht District was established by combining Fakhrud and Miyandasht Rural Districts.

References 

Darmian County

Populated places in South Khorasan Province

Populated places in Darmian County